Thuraiyur taluk is a taluk of Tiruchirapalli district of the Indian state of Tamil Nadu. The headquarters of the taluk is the town of Thuraiyur.

Demographics
According to the 2011 census, the taluk of Thuraiyur had a population of 249,060 with 123,062 males and 125,998 females. There were 1,024 women for every 1,000 men. The taluk had a literacy rate of 71.42%. Child population in the age group below 6 years were 11,705 males and 10,708 females.

Climate
In spite of hills surrounding this region, this taluk is very hot. In the summer temperatures rises up to 43 °C. In the winter the temperature here is mild and in night time it falls up to 14 °C. It has a foggy weather in the months of December and January. During the months of June and July wind speed is less in this region in comparison to other parts of Tamil Nadu.

References 

Taluks of Tiruchirapalli district